Ocean Falls Water Aerodrome  is located in Cousins Inlet, adjacent to Ocean Falls, British Columbia, Canada.

References

Seaplane bases in British Columbia
Central Coast Regional District
Registered aerodromes in British Columbia